Sana Mouziane (born 1980) is a Moroccan actress and singer.

Biography
Mouziane was born in Casablanca. When her parents divorced, she moved to Marrakesh. Mouziane moved to London at the age of nine. She took music lessons and decided to join a music group to enter in competitions. At age 17, Mouziane delivered her first public singing in Arabic at the Darlington International Festival. She stated that her life in England has given her a balance between Western culture and Eastern education which allows her to live her life to the fullest.

Mouziane released her debut single "Inta Lhoub" in 2004. Mouziane made her film debut in 2005, in Women in Search of Freedom directed by the Egyptian director Ines Al Dégheidi. The film deals with women living in exile and became a success in the Arab world, winning several awards at film festivals. The following year, she appeared in Ashra Haramy. In 2007, Mouziane portrayed a woman engaging in an adulterous relationship with her husband's nephew in Samira's Garden. She won best actress for this role at the Panafrican Film and Television Festival of Ouagadougou in 2009. In 2012, Mouziane played Zahra, the wife of the sheikh, in the historical drama  directed by Hamid Bennani. She called it a new experience, working on a film set during the French colonization. She played Martha, who discovers the risen Jesus, in the 2013 miniseries The Bible. She said she likes to take on daring roles.

Mouziane married the British engineer Alan Dearsley on 14 February 2013. According to her, it was love at first sight, as he was interested in her cultural background. The couple took their honeymoon in the Maldives. She gave birth to a son, Kenzi, in 2014 and took a break from acting.

Filmography
2005: Women in Search of Freedom
2006: Ashra Haramy
2007: Samira's Garden
2008: Cut Loose
2010: Cairo Exit
2012: 
2013: The Bible (TV series)
2014: 
2014: Son of God
2017:

References

External links
Sana Mouziane at the Internet Movie Database

1980 births
Living people
21st-century Moroccan actresses
Moroccan film actresses
Moroccan television actresses
21st-century Moroccan women singers